Pseudaletis batesi, the black fantasy, is a butterfly in the family Lycaenidae. The species was first described by Hamilton Herbert Druce in 1910. It is found in Cameroon, the Republic of the Congo, the Central African Republic and the Democratic Republic of the Congo. The habitat consists of forests.

Subspecies
Pseudaletis batesi batesi (Cameroon, Congo, Central African Republic)
Pseudaletis batesi zairensis Libert, 2007 (Democratic Republic of the Congo)

References

External links
Die Gross-Schmetterlinge der Erde 13: Die Afrikanischen Tagfalter. Plate XIII 66 g

Butterflies described in 1910
Pseudaletis